Man of Steel is the thirty-sixth studio album by American musician Hank Williams Jr. It was released by Warner Bros./Curb Records in September 1983, peaking at number 3 on the Billboard Top Country Albums chart. The title track of the album and the song "Queen of My Heart" were released as singles, peaking at number 3 and number 5 respectively on the Billboard Hot Country Singles & Tracks chart. Man of Steel was Williams' tenth album to reach the top five on the Top Country Albums chart and was his tenth album to be certified Gold by the RIAA. Man of Steel was nominated by the Academy of Country Music for the Album of the Year award in 1984.

Track listing

Chart performance

References

1983 albums
Hank Williams Jr. albums
Warner Records albums
Curb Records albums
Albums produced by Jimmy Bowen